Norman Wainwright (4 July 1914 – 2 May 2000) was an English freestyle and backstroke swimmer who competed for Great Britain in the 1932 Summer Olympics, in the 1936 Summer Olympics, and in the 1948 Summer Olympics.

He was born in Stoke-on-Trent.

In 1932 he was eliminated in the first round of the 400 metre freestyle event.

Four years later he was a member of the British team which finished sixth with the British team in the 4×200 metre freestyle relay competition at the 1936 Games. In the 1500 metre freestyle contest he was eliminated in the semi-finals and in the 400 metre freestyle event he was eliminated in the first round.

His last Olympic appearance was in 1948 when he competed with the British team in the 4×200 metre freestyle relay competition which did not advance to the final.

At the 1934 Empire Games he was a member of the English team which won the silver medal in the 4×200 yards freestyle contest. He also won a silver medal in the 440 yards event and a bronze medal in the 1500 yards competition. Four years later at the Empire Games in Sydney he was part of the English team which won the gold medal in the 4×220 yards freestyle event. In Sydney he also won a bronze medal in the 1650 yards event and participated in the 110 yards backstroke competition.

See also
 List of Commonwealth Games medallists in swimming (men)

External links
 

1914 births
2000 deaths
English male swimmers
English male freestyle swimmers
Male backstroke swimmers
Olympic swimmers of Great Britain
Swimmers at the 1932 Summer Olympics
Swimmers at the 1936 Summer Olympics
Swimmers at the 1948 Summer Olympics
Swimmers at the 1934 British Empire Games
Swimmers at the 1938 British Empire Games
Commonwealth Games gold medallists for England
Commonwealth Games silver medallists for England
Commonwealth Games bronze medallists for England
European Aquatics Championships medalists in swimming
Commonwealth Games medallists in swimming
Medallists at the 1934 British Empire Games
Medallists at the 1938 British Empire Games